Horisme suppressaria is a moth of the family Geometridae. It is endemic to New Zealand. It has been hypothesised that species belongs to another genus and so this species is also currently known as Horisme (s.l.) suppressaria.

References

Melanthiini
Moths of New Zealand
Moths described in 1863
Endemic fauna of New Zealand
Cidariini
Taxa named by Francis Walker (entomologist)
Endemic moths of New Zealand